The movement to secure the rights of Bengalis in Pakistan persisted until it culminated in the Bangladesh Liberation War, which led to the birth of the independent country of Bangladesh. However, following Bangladesh's independence, left-wing intellectuals portrayed Islam as a powerful opposing force in the Liberation War to further their political agenda. Despite this, historical evidence shows that the conflict aimed to establish justice within Islam rather than to oppose the religion itself. Islam played a crucial role in all the activities of the Bangladesh Awami League, the leading party in the war. In his March 7th speech, Sheikh Mujibur Rahman made an indirect declaration of independence, expressing his assurance of independence using the word Inshallah, an Islamic expression. After achieving victory, the temporary president of Bangladesh thanked Allah and called on the people to seek Allah's guidance and help in his official radio speech. Although the declaration of independence of Bangladesh aimed to ensure equality, human dignity, and social justice, the subsequent constitution did not fully address these goals in its four fundamental principles, which included secularism. During the war, 12%-14% of religious scholars supported the independence war, while 16%-18% opposed it. Among Islamic parties, the Jamiat Ulema-e-Islam Bangladesh supported the independence war, while the Bangladesh Jamaat-e-Islami and the Nizam-e-Islam Party opposed it. Nevertheless, after independence, all types of Islamists were blamed for opposing the independence war, and Islam was presented as a force against the war of independence, with the Islamic symbol being used as anti-independence in popular culture.

Bangladesh Awami League 

The Bangladesh Liberation War was spearheaded by the Bangladesh Awami League, which was founded on June 23, 1949, in Dhaka. During the Awami League's founding conference, their primary objective was to establish state sovereignty under the divine leadership of Allah and draft a constitution that reflected Islamic, democratic, and representative principles.

Wartime speeches and activities 
In 1971, during his historic speech on March 7, Sheikh Mujibur Rahman pledged to free the people of Bangladesh and invoked the Islamic expression "Insha'Allah." The temporary radio broadcasting center during the Bangladesh Liberation War was the Kalurghat, which broadcast thirteen episodes from March 26th to 30th.

Role of Islamists 
During the Bangladesh Liberation War, Jamiat-e-Ulema-e-Islam Bangladesh was in favor of the war. While the Jamaat-e-Islami and Nezam-e-Islami parties opposed the Liberation War, the Nezam-e-Islami was comparatively weaker in terms of its organizational structure.

Popular culture 
During the Liberation War, some Islamists supported it, while others opposed it. However, later on, all Islamists were accused of opposing the war. It's worth noting that not only Muslims, but also some non-Muslims such as Chakma King Tridev Roy and Bishuddhananda Mahathera, opposed the war. Nonetheless, the opposition of certain Islamic political parties was interpreted as being opposition to Islam as a religion.

In popular culture, people who wear traditional Islamic caps are often depicted as Razakars and murderers in movies, pictures, and cartoons. Islamic symbols, icons, and clothing are frequently portrayed as anti-liberation symbols in movies, dramas, poems, and posters. However, during the Liberation War, the majority of Razakars were not associated with any Islamic symbols.

Source of secularism 
On April 10, 1971, the declaration of independence for Bangladesh was issued, and it was officially recognized when the Mujibnagar government was inaugurated on April 17. The declaration set forth the goals of independence as ensuring equality, human dignity, and social justice. Notably, the declaration did not include any mention of secularism.

Related research 
Alem Muktijuddar Koje, written by Shakir Hossain Shibli, was first published in 2008 and sheds light on the contribution of scholars to the Liberation War of Bangladesh. The author highlights that while some Islamic political parties, like Jamaat-e-Islami and Nizam-e-Islam Party, opposed the Liberation War, the ulama (Islamic scholars) of Jamiat-e-Ulama-e-Islam Bangladesh were in favor of independence, and many of them directly contributed to the Liberation War.

References 

History of Pakistan
Separatism in Pakistan
Bangladesh Liberation War
History of Bangladesh
War crimes in Bangladesh
Wars involving Bangladesh
Islam in Bangladesh
History of Bengal
Military history of Bangladesh